Soda lime is a mixture of NaOH and CaO chemicals, used in granular form in closed breathing environments, such as general anaesthesia, submarines, rebreathers and recompression chambers, to remove carbon dioxide from breathing gases to prevent CO2 retention and carbon dioxide poisoning.

It is made by treating slaked lime with concentrated sodium hydroxide solution.

Chemical components 
The main components of soda lime are
 Calcium oxide, CaO (about 75%)
 Water, H2O (about 20%)
 Sodium hydroxide, NaOH (about 3%)
 Potassium hydroxide, KOH (about 0.1%).

Anaesthetic use
During the administration of general anaesthesia, the gases expired by a patient, which contain carbon dioxide, are passed through an anaesthetic machine breathing circuit filled with soda lime granules. Medical-grade soda lime includes an indicating dye that changes color when the soda lime reaches its carbon dioxide absorbing capacity.

To ensure that a soda lime canister (CO2 absorber) is functioning properly, it should not be used if the indicating dye is activated. Standard anaesthesia machines typically contain up to 2 kg of soda lime granules.

Lithium hydroxide (LiOH) is the alkali hydroxide with the lowest molecular weight (Na: 23 g/mol; Li: 7 g/mol) and is therefore used as CO2 absorbent in space flights since the Apollo program to spare weight at launch. During Apollo 13 flight, the crew sheltered in the lunar module started suffering from high CO2 levels and had to adapt spare absorbent cartridges from the Apollo capsule to the LEM system.

Recent generation of CO2 absorbents have been developed to reduce the risk of formation of toxic by-products as a result of the interaction between the absorbent and inhaled anesthetics (halothane). Some absorbents made from lithium hydroxide (LiOH) are also available for this purpose.

Rebreather use
Exhaled gas must be passed through a carbon dioxide scrubber where the carbon dioxide is absorbed before the gas is made available to be breathed again. In rebreathers the scrubber is a part of the breathing loop. Color indicating dye was removed from US Navy fleet use in 1996 when it was suspected of releasing chemicals into the circuit. In larger environments, such as recompression chambers or submarines, a fan is used to maintain the flow of gas through the scrubbing canister.

Chemical reaction

The overall reaction is:

CO2 + Ca(OH)2 → CaCO3 + H2O + heat (in the presence of water)

Each mole of CO2 (44 g) reacts with one mole of calcium hydroxide (74g) and produces one mole of water (18 g).

The reaction can be considered as a strong-base-catalysed, water-facilitated reaction.

The reaction mechanism of carbon dioxide with soda lime can be decomposed in three elementary steps:

1)  CO2(g) <=>> CO2(aq)            (CO2 dissolves in water – slow and rate-determining)

2) CO2(aq) + NaOH -> NaHCO3      (bicarbonate formation at high pH)

3) NaHCO3 + Ca(OH)2 -> CaCO3 + NaOH + H2O   (NaOH recycled to step 2 – hence a catalyst)

This sequence of reactions explains the catalytic role played by sodium hydroxide in the system and why soda lime is faster in chemical reactivity than calcium hydroxide alone. The moist NaOH impregnates the surface and the porosity of calcium hydroxide grains with a high specific surface area. It reacts much more quickly and so contributes to a faster elimination of the CO2 from the rebreathing circuit. The formation of water by the reaction and the moisture from the respiration also act as a solvent for the reaction. Reactions in aqueous phase are generally faster than between a dry gas and a dry solid. Soda lime is commonly used in closed-circuit diving rebreathers and in anesthesia systems.

The same catalytic effect by the alkali hydroxides (function of the Na2Oeq content of cement) also contributes to the carbonation of portlandite by atmospheric CO2 in concrete although the rate of propagation of the reaction front is there essentially limited by the CO2 diffusion within the concrete matrix less porous.

Analogy with the alkali-silica reaction

A similar reaction to above, also catalysed by sodium hydroxide, is the alkali-silica reaction, a slow degradation process causing the swelling and the cracking of concrete containing aggregates rich in reactive amorphous silica. In a very similar way, NaOH greatly facilitates the dissolution of the amorphous silica. The produced sodium silicate then reacts with the calcium hydroxide (portlandite) present in the hardened cement paste to form calcium silicate hydrate (abbreviated as C-S-H in the cement chemist notation). This silicification reaction of Ca(OH)2 on its turn continuously releases again sodium hydroxide in solution, maintaining a high pH, and the cycle continues up to the total disappearance of portlandite or reactive silica in the exposed concrete. Without the catalysis of this reaction by sodium or potassium soluble hydroxides the alkali-silica reaction would not proceed or would be limited to a very slow pozzolanic reaction. The alkali silica reaction can be written like the soda lime reaction, by simply substituting CO2 by SiO2 in the reactions mentioned here above as follows:

{| style="white-space:nowrap;"
|-
! style="text-align:left;" | reaction 1:
|   || align = "right" | SiO2 + NaOH ||   || → ||   || NaHSiO3||   ||silica dissolution by NaOH:high pH
|-
! style="text-align:left;" | reaction 2:
|   || align = "right" | NaHSiO3 + Ca(OH)2 ||   || → ||   || CaSiO3 + H2O + NaOH ||     ||C-S-H precipitationand regeneration of NaOH
|-
! style="text-align:left;" | sum (1+2):
|   || align = "right" | SiO2 + Ca(OH)2 ||   || → ||   || CaSiO3 + H2O ||     ||global reaction:Pozzolanic reaction catalysed by NaOH
|}

See also
 Carbon dioxide scrubber
 Alkali-silica reaction (ASR)
 Soda–lime glass, a type of glass made from silica, soda, lime, and aluminum oxide

References

External links
 
 Sofnolime MSDS Example of a commercial soda lime product that is used in diving and medicine
 An Introduction to Sofnolime (Technical Article)

Hydroxides
Calcium compounds
Sodium compounds
Anesthetic equipment

Catalysis